A Man Who Feeds The Dog was Channel A's entertainment program.

Broadcast time

Season 1 
A reality show which follows the lives of four celebrity men who own dogs.

Performer 
 Ju Byeong-jin
 Yang Se-hyung
 Yang Se-chan
 Shin Dong-ho
 Kim Min-jun
 Hyun Joo-yup
 Kangin
 Choi Hwa-jung
 I.O.I

Special Cast 
 Kim Seung-soo
 Dong Hyun Kim
 Kim Hyun-jung
 Chae Yeon
 Min Do-hee
 Choi Jung-yoon
 Lee Young-ha
 Kangta

Season 2 
For the so-called Homo Solitarius, who feel utterly alone in this hectic world, A Man Who Feeds the Dog has come back for its second season. In this season, three hottest celebrities who are nonetheless lonely meet three adorable dogs that will turn their lives upside down. The ultimate expert of pets, Kang Hyung-wook, will guide them through not-so-easy process of getting to know one's pet.

Performer 
 Sunny (Narration)
 Sung Yu-ri (Narration)
 Lee Tae-gon
 Choi Hyun-seok
 Kim Min-kyo
 Kang Hyung-wook 
 Lee Geung-young
 Kangta
 Swings
 Lovelyz

Special Cast 
 Go Soo-hee
 Kim Won-hae
 Park Chul-min
 Lee Geun-hee
 Cao Lu
 Heo Young-ji
 Lee Hye-jung
 Samuel
 Jisook
 Dong Hyun Kim
 Kim Jae-woo
 Seo Yu-ri

Season 3 
GUYS AND DOGS returns! In the third season, the show tackles the different theme, the dream that every pet owner must have dreamed for once in a lifetime. Celebrities and their pets challenge themselves to travel to a foreign country. Actors Yoon Jin-suh and Bae Jung-nam and their pets, respectively, take on a trip to abroad. They wander around beautiful cities, enjoy nature, and have a good time. You can feel joyful and happy just watching them enjoy their time together.

Performer 
 Yoon Jin-seo
 Bae Jung-nam

Season 4 (Global Pet Travel) 
Your dream of traveling with your pet came true! "Global Pet Travel" project where celebrity and pet travel the world.

Performer 
 Park Si-hoo
 Kim Hee-chul
 Kim Ji-min
 Kim So-hye
 Christian Burgos

See also

References

External links 
 개밥 주는 남자 2 홈페이지
 개밥 주는 남자 3 홈페이지
 개밥 주는 남자 개묘한 여행 홈페이지
 
 

South Korean variety television shows
Korean-language television shows
2015 South Korean television series debuts